The Precision 15 CB is an American sailing dinghy, that was designed by Jim Taylor and first built in 1995.

There was also a version of the same design with a fixed keel, the Precision 15, sometimes called the Precision 15 K (for keel).

Production
The design was built by Precision Boat Works in Palmetto, Florida, United States from 1995 to 2018. More than 800 examples of both models were produced.

Design

The Precision 15 is a recreational sailboat, built predominantly of fiberglass, with a vinyl ester resin skin coat. It has a fractional sloop rig with anodized aluminum spars and a hinged mast step. The hull has a raked stem, a plumb transom, a transom-hung, kick-up rudder controlled by a wooden tiller, with a tiller extension and a retractable centerboard. The boat has foam flotation, a boom vang and jib tracks.

The manufacturer lists the boat's design goals as "safety, stability, reliable handling, and sprightly speed under sail".

An optional mount may be fitted for a small outboard motor for docking and maneuvering.

See also
List of sailing boat types

References

External links

Dinghies
1990s sailboat type designs
Two-person sailboats
Sailboat types built in the United States
Sailboat type designs by Jim Taylor Yacht Designs
Sailboat types built by Precision Boat Works